is a Japanese freestyle wrestler. In 2018, she won the silver medal in the women's 50 kg event at the 2018 Asian Games held in Jakarta, Indonesia. In the final, she lost against Vinesh Phogat of India.

In 2015, she won the gold medal in the women's 48 kg event at the 2015 Asian Wrestling Championships held in Doha, Qatar. She repeated this at the 2019 Asian Wrestling Championships held in Xi'an, China.

Major results

References

External links 
 

Living people
1992 births
Place of birth missing (living people)
Japanese female sport wrestlers
Wrestlers at the 2018 Asian Games
Asian Games medalists in wrestling
Asian Games silver medalists for Japan
Medalists at the 2018 Asian Games
21st-century Japanese women